Demarcus Dejuan Holland (born March 2, 1994) is an American basketball player who last played for the Delaware Blue Coats of the NBA G League. He played four seasons of college basketball with the Texas Longhorns.

Professional career

Plaza Fernando Valerio (2016–2017)
Holland started his professional career with Plaza Fernando Valerio in Italy.

South Bay Lakers (2017–2018)
Holland returned to the United States to play with the South Bay Lakers of the NBA D-League in 2017. In the 2017–18 season, he averaged 8.5 points and 4.6 rebounds per game.

Agua Caliente Clippers (2018–2019)
On December 2, 2018, Holland was traded to the Agua Caliente Clippers in exchange for a first-round draft pick.

BC Nokia (2019–2020)
On September 25, 2019, Holland signed a one-year contract with BC Nokia in the Finnish Korisliiga. In December 2019, the Texas Legends acquired the NBA D-League rights to Holland.

Hamburg Towers (2020)
In January 2020, Holland signed with Hamburg Towers of the German Basketball Bundesliga.

Science City Jena (2020–2021)
In the 2020–21 season, Holland played with Science City Jena of the German Basketball Bundesliga.

Ferroviário de Maputo (2021)
In May 2021, Holland played with Mozambican club Ferroviário de Maputo in the 2021 BAL season, the first season of the Basketball Africa League. He started in all four games and averaged 13.8 points, and helped Ferroviário reach the quarter-finals.

Saskatchewan Rattlers (2021)
In July 2021, Holland signed with the Saskatchewan Rattlers of the Canadian Elite Basketball League, to play in the 2021 season.

Delaware Blue Coats (2021–2022)
In October 2021, Holland was claimed by the Delaware Blue Coats. He was removed from the team on January 29, 2022, but re-acquired on February 2.

Personal life
At the University of Texas, Holland majored in Physical Culture and Sports and graduated in 2016.

BAL career statistics

|-
|style="text-align:left;"|2021
|style="text-align:left;"|Ferroviário de Maputo
| 4 || 4 || style="background:#cfecec;"| 36.2* || .308 || .300 || .750 || 3.5 || 5.5|| 1.5 || .0 || 13.8
|- class="sortbottom"
| style="text-align:center;" colspan="2"|Career
| 4 || 4 || 36.2 || .308 || .300 || .750 || 3.5 || 5.5|| 1.5 || .0 || 13.8

References

External links

1994 births
Living people
Agua Caliente Clippers players
American expatriate basketball people in Canada
American expatriate basketball people in Finland
American expatriate basketball people in Germany
American expatriate basketball people in Italy
American expatriate basketball people in Mozambique
American men's basketball players
BC Nokia players
Delaware Blue Coats players
Ferroviário de Maputo (basketball) players
Hamburg Towers players
People from Garland, Texas
Saskatchewan Rattlers players
Science City Jena players
Shooting guards
South Bay Lakers players